Marie Helene Aul (6 March 1893 Tallinn – 1955 Tallinn) was an Estonian politician. She was a member of Estonian Constituent Assembly, representing the Estonian Social Democratic Workers' Party. On 12 May 1919, she resigned her post and was replaced by Karl Michael Lukk.

References

1893 births
1955 deaths
Politicians from Tallinn
People from Kreis Harrien
Estonian Social Democratic Workers' Party politicians
Members of the Estonian Constituent Assembly